A Piece of Cake is an EP released by the alternative rock band Cake in 1996. The EP/Sampler was released as a teaser to the then-upcoming album Fashion Nugget. For an unknown reason, "The Distance" is listed and pressed twice into the CD; once at the beginning, and once at the end.

Track listing

"The Distance" – 3:00
"Friend Is a Four Letter Word" – 3:17
"Daria"  3:44
"Open Book" – 3:44
"Frank Sinatra" – 3:58
"The Distance" – 3:00

References

External links
Official band website

1996 EPs
Cake (band) albums
Sampler albums
Capricorn Records albums